Carinodrillia bilirata is a species of sea snail, a marine gastropod mollusk in the family Pseudomelatomidae.

References

 Smith, Edgar A. "XXXVIII.—Diagnoses of new species of Pleurotomidæ in the British Museum." Journal of Natural History 2.10 (1888): 300–317.

External links
 

bilirata
Gastropods described in 1888